Alejandro Ferreiro (born 20 March 1961) is a sailor from Uruguay, who represented his country at the 1984 Summer Olympics in Los Angeles, United States as crew member in the Soling. With helmsman Bernd Knuppel and fellow crew member Enrique Dupont they took the 16th place.

References

Living people
1961 births
Sailors at the 1984 Summer Olympics – Soling
Sailors at the 1988 Summer Olympics – Star
Olympic sailors of Uruguay
Uruguayan male sailors (sport)